Kifli, kiflice, kifle or kipferl is a traditional yeast bread roll that is rolled and formed into a crescent before baking.

It is a common type of bread roll throughout much of central Europe and nearby countries, where it is called by different names. It is thought to be the inspiration for the French croissant, which has a very similar shape but is made with a different type of dough.

Names 
The roll or pastry is called:
kifli in Hungarian
kipfl in Austrian Italy
Kipferl in Austrian German
küpfel or a Meidlinger roll in Vienna
kifla or кифла (pl. kifle or kiflice) in Croatian, Bosnian, and Serbian
кифла or kifla in Bulgarian
кифла in Macedonian
kifle in Albanian
giffel in Danish and Swedish
rogal or rogalik (little horn) in Polish
rohlík in  Czech
rožok in Slovak
рогалик/rogalik in Russian
рогалик/rohalyk in Ukrainian
rogljiček or kifelc in Slovene
cornuleț in Romanian
horn (horn) in Norwegian
Hörnchen (little horn) in German

In Old High German, Kipfa meant "carriage stanchion" and referred to the stanchions or "horns" of a cart. In the 13th century, that usage referred to a bread shape of pagan origin.

The Czech, Slovak, Polish, Slovenian, Ukrainian and Russian names derive as diminuitives from the Slavic word rogal or rohel ("horned") which in turn derives from "rog/roh" ("horn/protrusion"). Some other languages use a simple translation ("horn", "cornulet"). 

The similarity of the words "rohalyk" or "rohlík" with the English word „roll“ is coincidental, the words are not related by origin. The Slavic root "rog" can be hypothetically related with the German verb "ragen" ("to protrude").

Background
Kifli are a traditional yeasted bread rolled into a crescent shape. The Austrian  is a small wheat roll with pointed ends. The 17th-century Austrian monk Abraham a Sancta Clara described the roll as crescent shaped, writing "the moon in the first quarter shines like a kipfl", and noted there were kifli in various forms: "vil lange, kurze, krumpe und gerade kipfel" ("many long, short, crooked and straight kipfel"). 

Breads or pastries in the shape of a crescent moon are believed to have been served in ancient times as offerings to the goddess of the moon, Selene. The shape is also reminiscent of horns; both are associated with ancient symbolism and considered the oldest surviving pastry shape. A moon shaped pastry creates itself naturally by hand-rolling a ball of dough into a cylinder form.

A list of foods eaten in a 10th-century convent include panis lunatis, described as a small crescent-shaped roll often eaten during fasts.

The kifli has been documented in Austria to at least 1227 when they were recorded in Babenberg-ruled Vienna as chipfen:

In Austria the kifli (nowadays called Kipferl) is formally recognized by the government as a traditional food. According to the Austrian Ministry of Sustainability and Tourism, kifli were probably a traditional monastery pastry baked for Easter. They are described as crescent-shaped rolls made of yeast wheat dough in a variety of shapes and as being popular for coffee breaks and breakfasts, particularly in Vienna.

The kifli likely inspired the similarly shaped French croissant, which is made from a laminated pastry dough.

Origin myths 
A common culinary myth claims that when Christian forces freed Buda from Ottoman occupation in 1686 the bakers of the town celebrated the victory the next day by selling freshly baked bread rolls made into a crescent shape. Another story claims the Kipferl was invented in Vienna after or during the siege of the city by Ottoman Turks.

Preparation 
Traditionally, kifli are made by cutting sheets of soft yeast dough into triangular wedges, rolling them into crescent shapes and baking them. Unlike the French croissant (crescent), Kifli is made from a plain, bread-like dough and is more akin to a roll than to pastry. Kifli is also thinner and longer than the croissant. Kifli are made in various sizes; some of them weigh as much as small bread loaf.

In commercial preparation, the dough is mixed, cut into small pieces, and fed into a machine that flattens and rolls it. The following manual process is similar to the traditional process.

Varieties

Regular

When they come out of the oven, the rolls can be left plain or brushed with water to make them shiny. They can be given an egg wash and sprinkled with either poppy seeds or caraway seeds mixed with coarse salt. The latter variety is often made into a straight shape rather than a crescent. Kifli is eaten like bread or rolls; it is usually made into a sandwich, sometimes plain or with butter like a fresh baguette. Often, especially for breakfast, the topping is jam or honey. They may also be used for dunking.

Fine
This is the same as the regular style but the dough may contain butter or other shortening and milk. It is sweeter than the regular variety and is well-suited to be eaten with jam or honey, and is commonly eaten for breakfast with coffee, hot chocolate or milk. It might also be an accompaniment for drinks like Doogh and Kumis.

Sweets 
There are a couple of sweet rolls named "kifli" to describe their shape; they are eaten at the end of a meal or with an afternoon drink; these are not kifli, which when used on its own, always means the regular or fine varieties. In German, these are differentiated with a different spelling: Kipferl compared to Kipfel for the yeast bread.

Vanillekipferl is a small, very short soft cookie made from a dough of ground nuts instead of flour. It is originally made with walnuts but almonds are more often used outside of Hungary. Once baked they are rolled in vanilla-flavored confectioners' sugar then allowed to cool.
Bratislavský rožok/bratislavské rožky, diós kifli, mákos kifli, also known as Pozsonyi kifli and in German as Preßburger Kipfel, are crescent-shaped, sweet, leavened pastries filled with a sweet walnut or poppy paste. Under the name Bratislavský rožok / Pozsonyi kiflia, they are registered as Traditional Speciality Guaranteed products in the EU and the UK. They are a variety of beigli, very similar in flavor but different in shape and size.
 Lupáčik, incorrectly presented as lúpačka, is a sweet pastry made of fatty dough, often decorated with poppy seeds.

Other uses 
Stale kipfel are used to make a sweet bread pudding called Kipfelkoch.

Gallery

See also

List of breads
Cornetto, an Italian crescent pastry
Rogal świętomarciński, a crescent cake baked in Poznań, Poland, for St. Martin's Day
Rugelach, a filled crescent pastry popular in Jewish communities in Poland

References

Pastries with poppy seeds
Austrian pastries
Bosnia and Herzegovina cuisine
Bulgarian pastries
Croatian pastries
Czech pastries
Hungarian pastries
Macedonian cuisine
Serbian cuisine
Slovak cuisine
German breads
Hungarian breads
Breads of the Czech Republic
Serbian breads
Austrian breads
Easter bread